The 2012 MTN 8 was the 38th time that this annual tournament took place. It was contested by the eight top teams of the Premier Soccer League table at the end of the 2011–12 season. The tournament began on 3 August 2012.

Teams
The eight teams that competed in the MTN 8 knockout competition are: (listed according to their finishing position in the 2011-12 Premier Soccer League season.

 1. Orlando Pirates
 2. Moroka Swallows
 3. SuperSport United
 4. Mamelodi Sundowns
 5. Kaizer Chiefs
 6. Free State Stars
 7. AmaZulu
 8. Bloemfontein Celtic

Fixtures & Results

Rules for MTN8

On 28 July 2011 The PSL Executive Committee held a meeting to discuss the issue of home and away fixtures. There has been an amendment to the MTN8 rules pertaining to the issue of home and away fixtures. 	
	
		The approved rule reads as follows: In the first round of the competition (last 8 or quarter-finals) the clubs finishing in the top four positions of the Premier Division in the previous season will be the home clubs.

Quarter-finals

Teams through to the Semi-finals

 1 Orlando Pirates
 2 SuperSport United
 3 Mamelodi Sundowns
 4 Moroka Swallows

Semi-finals

|}

1st Leg

2nd Leg

Final

Statistics

Top Goal Scorer

External links
Premier Soccer League
South African Football Association

MTN 8
MTN
2012 domestic association football cups